Ditylum is a genus of diatoms belonging to the family Lithodesmiaceae.

The genus has cosmopolitan distribution.

Species:
Ditylum brightwellii 
Ditylum buchananii 
Ditylum cornutum 
Ditylum ehrenbergii 
Ditylum grovei 
Ditylum inaequale 
Ditylum pernodi 
Ditylum segmentale 
Ditylum sol 
Ditylum trigonum 
Ditylum trigonum

References

Diatoms
Diatom genera